Mariana Castells is a Spanish-American allergist who focuses on mast cell diseases, including mastocytosis,mast cell activation syndrome and hereditary alpha tryptasimia. Mastocytosis is a rare disease with limited treatment options. Castells works at Brigham and Women's Hospital in Massachusetts in the Department of Allergy, Rheumatology, and Immunology and at the Dana Farber Cancer Institute. She is also a professor of medicine at Harvard Medical School.

Education 
Castells attended medical school at Autonomous University of Barcelona, Spain and was a resident at University of Kansas Medical Center. She also has a PhD.

Career 
Castells is a leader in the mastocytosis treatment and research field, and directs both the Mastocytosis Center of Excellence and the Drug Hypersensitivity and Desensitization Center at Brigham and Women's Hospital. She is also part of the medical advisory board for The Mastocytosis Society. Castells leads clinical trials related to both mast cell disease and drug desensitization. In her desensitization research, she works to reduce allergic reactions to chemotherapy and other kinds of drugs. 

Castells is often quoted as an expert in media articles about seasonal environmental allergies.

Honors and awards 
 James S. Winshall, MD, Leadership Award, 2016
 American Academy of Allergy, Asthma and Immunology (AAAAI) Board of Directors

References

External links 
 Selected publications

Living people
Year of birth missing (living people)
Allergologists
Harvard Medical School faculty
Spanish women physicians
Autonomous University of Barcelona alumni